Juhani Salmenkylä (8 March 1932 – 4 May 2022) was a Finnish orienteering competitor and European champion, basketball player, coach, referee and contributor. He was born in Helsinki. In orienteering he won a gold medal with the Finnish relay team at the 1964 European Orienteering Championships in Le Brassus.

Orienteering 
Salmenkylä received a silver medal in the relay at the 1966 World Orienteering Championships with the Finnish team, and again in 1968.

His daughter Leena Salmenkylä was World Champion in relay in 1979.

Basketball 
Salmenkylä impacted Finnish basketball with large radius. As a player, he won seven national championships. As a referee he participated in many tournaments abroad, including the 1964 Summer Olympics in Tokyo. He was also a top tier coach in Finland, and served as the head of Finnish Basketball Association in 1969–1972.

In August 2015 Salmenkylä was inducted into the Finnish Basketball Hall of Fame.

See also
 Finnish orienteers
 List of orienteers
 List of orienteering events

References

1932 births
2022 deaths
Sportspeople from Helsinki
Finnish orienteers
Male orienteers
Foot orienteers
World Orienteering Championships medalists
Finnish men's basketball players
Finnish basketball coaches
Basketball referees